The Master and Margarita is a novel by Mikhail Bulgakov.

The Master and Margarita may also refer to:

The Master and Margarita (1988 TV series), Polish television series
Der Meister und Margarita, 1989 opera by York Höller after the novel
The Master and Margarita (1994 film), Russian film
The Master and Margarita (miniseries), 2005 Russian television miniseries

See also
The Master and Margaret (1972 film), Italian-Yugoslav film
 Pilate and Others, 1972 German film based on the novel